Laura Efrikian (born 14 June 1940), is an Italian actress and television personality. She is of Armenian descent.

Life and career 
Born in Treviso as Laura Ephrikian, the daughter of the conductor and musicologist Angelo Ephrikian, Efrikian graduated in acting at the drama school of the Piccolo Teatro in Milan.

Since 1960 Efrikian intensively worked in theater, television and films, notably hosting the 1962 edition of the Sanremo Music Festival. After the film debut in the 1961 peplum film Hercules and the Conquest of Atlantis, Efrikian starred in several Musicarelli films with Gianni Morandi, whom she married in 1966;  the couple divorced in 1979.

Selected filmography
 Hercules and the Conquest of Atlantis (1961)
 La Cittadella (1964)
 Tears on Your Face (1964)
 Non son degno di te (1965)
 Se non avessi più te (1965)
 The Young Nun (1965)
 Nessuno mi può giudicare (1966)
 Perdono (1966)
 Rita the Mosquito (1968)
 Chimera (1968)
 Things from Another World (2011)

References

External links 

Italian film actresses
Italian television actresses
1940 births
People from Treviso
Italian stage actresses
Living people
Italian people of Armenian descent